Kivioq Fjord is a fjord in King Christian IX Land, Eastern Greenland. It is part of the Sermersooq municipality.

Geography
This fjord lies in the Blosseville Coast east of Nansen Fjord. Its mouth lies between Cape Garde to the west and Cape Normann to the east. The fjord is oriented in a NW/SE direction. It has a glacier at its head and another discharging in its eastern shore.

See also
List of fjords of Greenland

References

Fjords of Greenland